Herman Ssewanyana is a Ugandan musician and percussionist. He is the current Band Leader, Musical Director and Percussionist with the musical group Percussion Discussion Africa. He is a member and percussionist with the musical band Afrigo Band, the longest-lasting musical band in Uganda, which was founded in 1975.

Background and education
He was born on in the Central Region of Uganda circa 1955.

Music career
Ssewanyana was a member of the Afrigo Band, since circa 1980. In 1997, while still with Afrigo, he founded Percussion Discussion Africa, focusing on cultural music, with emphasis on African percussion instruments. Since 2011, he has collaborated with other Ugandan music artists to produce the annual music festival known as Zivuge. In 2012, he was part of The Percussion Gurus, Qwela Junction, a two-hour performance by leading Ugandan percussionists, held at Emin Pasha Hotel in Kampala on 30 March 2012.

See also
 Afrigo Band
 Moses Matovu
 Joanita Kawalya

References

External links
 The Aaron Thurston Trio Set Kampala On Fire
  The Finest 50 Musicians And Music Groups Since Independence

1955 births
Living people
Kampala District
Ugandan musicians
Ganda people
Members of Afrigo Band